Tarik Cmajcanin (born 18 June 1994) is a Serbian footballer who plays for KF Trepça '89.

Career
Born in Novi Pazar, Serbia, Cmajcanin started his career at local club FK Novi Pazar. He next signed for Serbian League East side FK Sinđelić Niš where he made 27 league appearances and scored 6 goals while assisting another 7.

Cmajcanin was signed by S.League side Balestier Khalsa FC for the 2015 S.League season as a replacement for outgoing playmaker Park Kang-jin. He made his competitive debut for the Tigers in the 2015 Singapore Charity Shield, which doubled as the first league match of the season, but saw his side lose 1-0 to Warriors FC. Although Balestier had qualified for the 2015 AFC Cup, Cmajcanin will see no action on the continental stage as he was left out of Balestier's AFC Cup squad as a result of the 3+1 rule.

Čmajčanin scored his first competitive goal after 4 league games for the Tigers in a 5-1 demolition of Courts Young Lions on 4 April 2015.

Čmajčanin signed for KF Ballkani in Kosovo in January 2019. In 2020, he joined KF Trepça '89. He suffered a serious injury in March 2020.

Career statistics

Club

References

External links

1994 births
Living people
Sportspeople from Novi Pazar
Association football defenders
Serbian footballers
Serbian expatriate footballers
FK Sinđelić Niš players
Balestier Khalsa FC players
FC Mika players
KF Teuta Durrës players
KF Ballkani players
Singapore Premier League players
Armenian Premier League players
Kategoria Superiore players
Serbian expatriate sportspeople in Singapore
Serbian expatriate sportspeople in Armenia
Serbian expatriate sportspeople in Albania
Expatriate footballers in Singapore
Expatriate footballers in Armenia
Expatriate footballers in Albania
Expatriate footballers in Kosovo